Barton MacLane (December 25, 1902 – January 1, 1969) was an American actor, playwright, and screenwriter. He appeared in many classic films from the 1930s through the 1960s, including his role as General Martin Peterson on the 1960s NBC television comedy series I Dream of Jeannie, with Barbara Eden and Larry Hagman.

Early life
MacLane was born in Columbia, South Carolina, on Christmas Day, 1902. He attended Wesleyan University in Middletown, Connecticut, where he excelled at American football. His first movie role, in The Quarterback (1926), was a result of his athletic ability. He then attended the American Academy of Dramatic Arts.

Career
He made his Broadway debut in 1927, playing the assistant district attorney in Bayard Veiller's The Trial of Mary Dugan. He then performed in the 1928 Broadway production of Gods of the Lightning and was part of the original cast of Subway Express as Officer Mulvaney in 1929. He appeared in the Marx Brothers' 1929 film debut The Cocoanuts. MacLane made his first credited film appearance in the 1931 romantic drama His Woman. The following year, he wrote the play Rendezvous, which he sold to Arthur Hopkins. The play was performed on Broadway, with MacLane in a featured role.

Film work: 1930s–1950s

The success of Rendezvous landed MacLane a contract with Warner Bros. and brought him to the attention of several renowned film directors, including Fritz Lang, Michael Curtiz, and William Keighley. As a result, throughout the remainder of the 1930s, MacLane was highly active in film, with major supporting roles in such productions as The Case of the Curious Bride, G Men, The Prince and the Pauper, and Lang's You Only Live Once and You and Me. He also played the role of detective Steve McBride, opposite Glenda Farrell in seven of the nine films featuring the fictional newspaper reporter Torchy Blane.

During the 1930s and 1940s, MacLane worked alongside Humphrey Bogart in several films. He played Lieutenant Dundy, who interacted with Bogart's Sam Spade in The Maltese Falcon, writer/director John Huston's acclaimed film noir based upon Dashiell Hammett's novel. MacLane again collaborated with both Bogart and Huston on the Academy Award-winning 1948 adventure film The Treasure of the Sierra Madre.

MacLane's many other film credits during the 1940s include The Big Street, Victor Fleming's Dr. Jekyll and Mr Hyde, Fritz Lang's Western Union, Reginald Le Borg's The Mummy's Ghost, and Frank Borzage's The Spanish Main. He also played villains in two Tarzan films starring Johnny Weissmuller – Tarzan and the Amazons and Tarzan and the Huntress. Some of MacLane's films during the 1950s include Kiss Tomorrow Goodbye, The Glenn Miller Story, and Three Violent People. In 1955 MacLane appeared as Jim Mablett in the movie Foxfire co-starring Jane Russell.

Television and final films
In the 1950s, MacLane began to appear regularly on television. Between 1953 and 1967, he guest starred on such programs as Conflict, Lux Video Theatre, Westinghouse Desilu Playhouse, Laramie, The Monkees, and Gunsmoke.  In 1958 he played Sen. Harriman Baylor in the Perry Mason episode, "The Case of the Foot-Loose Doll".  In 1960 he played Eugene Norris, Perry's friend and small-town sheriff, in "The Case of the Violent Village".  In 1964 he played Archer Osmond in "The Case of the Ruinous Road".

During the 1960–1961 television season, MacLane was a series regular on twenty-seven episodes of NBC's  western, Outlaws, in which he played Marshal Frank Caine. His last feature film was Buckskin (1968).

In 1965, MacLane, who had played real-life Air Force General "Hap" Arnold in The Glenn Miller Story, was cast in the recurring role of fictional Air Force General Martin Peterson on I Dream of Jeannie. He appeared in 35 episodes of the TV series between 1965 and 1969. Three of MacLane's episodes were aired after his death in January 1969. His character was replaced on later episodes of the series by General Winfield Schaeffer, portrayed by Vinton Hayworth, until Hayworth's death in 1970. Coincidentally, Hayworth also died before all episodes featuring his character were broadcast.

Personal life
Maclane played several musical instruments, including the violin, piano, and guitar. In 1939, MacLane married actress Charlotte Wynters. From the 1940s until his death, he maintained a cattle ranch in eastern Madera County, California, where he made his home when he was not acting. He adopted a daughter.

Death
MacLane died of double pneumonia at age 66 on New Year's Day, at Saint John's Health Center in Santa Monica, California, a week after his 66th birthday. He had been admitted two weeks prior to his death.

MacLane was buried in Valhalla Memorial Park Cemetery.

Recognition
For his contribution to the television industry, MacLane has a star on the Hollywood Walk of Fame at 6719 Hollywood Boulevard.

Selected filmography

 The Quarterback (1926) as Football Player (uncredited)
 The Cocoanuts (1929) as Bather (uncredited)
 His Woman (1931) as Crewman (uncredited)
 State's Attorney (1932) as Court Reporter (uncredited)
 The Thundering Herd (1933) as Pruitt
 Man of the Forest (1933) as Henchman Mulvey
 To the Last Man (1933) as Neil Stanley
 Tillie and Gus (1933) as Commissioner McLennan
 Big Executive (1933) as Harry the Guide
 Lone Cowboy (1933) as Policeman Baxter
 Hell and High Water (1933) as Dance Hall Manager
 All of Me (1934) as First Cop (uncredited)
 The Last Round-Up (1934) as Charley Benson
 Black Fury (1935) as McGee
 The Case of the Curious Bride (1935) as Detective Lucas
 G Men (1935) as Collins
 Go Into Your Dance (1935) as Duke Hutchinson
 Stranded (1935) as Sharkey
 Page Miss Glory (1935) as Blackie
 The Case of the Lucky Legs (1935) as Police Chief Bisonette
 Dr. Socrates (1935) as Red Bastian
 I Found Stella Parish (1935) as Clifton Jeffords
 Frisco Kid (1935) as Spider Burke
 Man of Iron (1935) as Chris Bennett
 Ceiling Zero (1936) as Al Stone
 The Walking Dead (1936) as Loder
 Times Square Playboy (1936) as Casey, Vic's Butler / Trainer
 Bullets or Ballots (1936) as Al Kruger
 Bengal Tiger (1936) as Cliff Ballenger
 Jailbreak (1936) as Detective Captain Rourke
 Smart Blonde (1937) as Steve McBride
 God's Country and the Woman (1937) as Bullhead
 You Only Live Once (1937) as Stephen Whitney
 The Prince and the Pauper (1937) as John Canty
 Draegerman Courage (1937) as Andrew Beaupre
 San Quentin (1937) as Lt. Druggin
 Fly-Away Baby (1937) as Steve McBride
 Ever Since Eve (1937) as Al McCoy
 Born Reckless (1937) as Jim Barnes
 Wine, Women and Horses (1937) as Jim Turner
 The Adventurous Blonde (1937) as Steve MacBride
 Blondes at Work (1938) as Lieutenant Steve McBride
 The Kid Comes Back (1938) as 'Gunner' Malone
 Gold Is Where You Find It (1938) as Slag Martin
 You and Me (1938) as Mickey Bain
 Prison Break (1938) as Joaquin Shannon
 The Storm (1938) as Capt. Cogswell
 Torchy Gets Her Man (1938) as Steve McBride
 Stand Up and Fight (1939) as Crowder
 Torchy Blane in Chinatown (1939) as Police Lieutenant Steve McBride
 I Was a Convict (1939) as Ace King
 Big Town Czar (1939) as Phil Daley
 Torchy Runs for Mayor (1939) as Steve McBride
 Mutiny in the Big House (1939) as Red Manson
 Gangs of Chicago (1940) as Jim Ramsey
 Men Without Souls (1940) as Blackie Drew
The Secret Seven (1940) as Sam O'Donnell
 Melody Ranch (1940) as Mark Wildhack
 High Sierra (1941) as Jake Kranmer
 Come Live with Me (1941) as Barney Grogan
 Western Union (1941) as Jack Slade
 Barnacle Bill (1941) as John Kelly
 Hit the Road (1941) as James J. Ryan
 Manpower (1941) as Smiley Quinn
 Dr. Jekyll and Mr. Hyde (1941) as Sam Higgins
 Wild Geese Calling (1941) as Pirate Kelly
 The Maltese Falcon (1941) as Lieutenant Dundy
 All Through the Night (1942) as Marty Callahan
 The Big Street (1942) as Case Ables
 Highways by Night (1942) as Leo Bronson
 Man of Courage (1943) as John Wallace
 A Gentle Gangster (1943) as Mike Hallit
 Bombardier (1943) as Sgt. Archie Dixon
 Song of Texas (1943) as Jim Calvert
 The Underdog (1943) as John Tate
 The Crime Doctor's Strangest Case (1943) as Detective Rief
 Nabonga (1944) as Carl Hurst
 Marine Raiders (1944) as Sgt. Maguire
 The Mummy's Ghost (1944) as Inspector Walgreen
 Secret Command (1944) as Red Kelly
 Cry of the Werewolf (1944) as Lt. Barry Lane
 Gentle Annie (1944) as Sheriff Tatum
 Tarzan and the Amazons (1945) as Ballister
 Scared Stiff (1945) as George 'Deacon' Markham
 The Spanish Main (1945) as Capt. Benjamin Black
 Mysterious Intruder (1946) as Detective Taggart
 Santa Fe Uprising (1946) as Crawford
 San Quentin (1946) as Nick Taylor
 Tarzan and the Huntress (1947) as Paul Weir
 Jungle Flight (1947) as Case Hagin
 Cheyenne (1947) as Webb Yancey
 The Treasure of the Sierra Madre (1948) as Pat McCormick
 Relentless (1948) as Tex Brandow
 Silver River (1948) as 'Banjo' Sweeney
 The Dude Goes West (1948) as Texas Jack Barton
 The Walls of Jericho (1948) as Gotch McCurdy
 Angel in Exile (1948) as Max Giorgio
 Unknown Island (1948) as Capt. Tarnowski
 Red Light (1949) as Strecker
 Kiss Tomorrow Goodbye (1950) as Police Lt. John Reece
 Rookie Fireman (1950) as Captain Jess Henshaw
 Let's Dance (1950) as Larry Channock
 The Bandit Queen (1950) as Jim Harden
 Best of the Badmen (1951) as Joad
 Drums in the Deep South (1951) as Sgt. Mac McCardle
 Bugles in the Afternoon (1952) as Capt. Myles Moylan
 The Half-Breed (1952) as Marshal Cassidy
 Thunderbirds (1952) as Sgt. Durkee
 Kansas Pacific (1953) as Cal Bruce
 Cow Country (1953) as Marvin Parker
 Captain Scarface (1953) as Captain Scarface
 Sea of Lost Ships (1953) as Capt. Jack Matthews
 Jack Slade (1953) as Jules Reni
 The Glenn Miller Story (1954) as General Arnold
 Jubilee Trail (1954) as Deacon Bartlett
 Rails Into Laramie (1954) as Lee Graham
 Hell's Outpost (1954) as Sheriff Olson
 Treasure of Ruby Hills (1955) as 'Chalk' Reynolds
 The Silver Star (1955) as Henry 'Tiny' Longtree
 Foxfire (1955) as Jim Mablett
 Jail Busters (1955) as Captain Jenkins, Head Guard
 Last of the Desperados (1955) as Mosby, Gang Leader
 Jaguar (1956) as Steve Bailey
 Backlash (1956) as Sgt. George Lake
 Wetbacks (1956)  as Karl Shanks
 The Man is Armed (1956) as Det. Lt. Dan Coster
 Naked Gun (1956) as Joe Barnum
 Three Violent People (1956) as Yates
 Hell's Crossroads (1957) as Pinkerton Agent Clyde O'Connell
 Sierra Stranger (1957) as Lem Gotch
 Naked in the Sun (1957) as Wilson
 Girl in the Woods (1958) as Big Jim
 Girl on the Run (1958) as Francis J. Brannigan
 Frontier Gun (1958) as Simon Crayle
 The Geisha Boy (1958) as Maj. Ridgley
 Gunfighters of Abilene (1960) as Seth Hainline
 Noose for a Gunman (1960) as Carl Avery
 Pocketful of Miracles (1961) as Police Commissioner
 Law of the Lawless (1964) as Big Tom Stone
 The Rounders (1965) as Tanner
 Town Tamer (1965) as James Fenimore Fell
 Arizona Bushwhackers (1968) as Sheriff Grover
 Buckskin (1968) as Dr. H. 'Doc' Raymond

Television credits

References

External links

 
 
 
 
 
 Literature on Barton MacLane

1902 births
1969 deaths
Male actors from Columbia, South Carolina
American Academy of Dramatic Arts alumni
American male film actors
Male Western (genre) film actors
Ranchers from California
American male stage actors
American male screenwriters
American male television actors
Burials at Valhalla Memorial Park Cemetery
Deaths from pneumonia in California
Male actors from Los Angeles
People from Madera County, California
Wesleyan University alumni
20th-century American male actors
20th-century American dramatists and playwrights
American male dramatists and playwrights
Writers from Columbia, South Carolina
20th-century American male writers
Warner Bros. contract players
Screenwriters from California
Screenwriters from South Carolina
20th-century American screenwriters
Western (genre) television actors